TOra (Toolkit for Oracle) is a free software database development and administration GUI, available under the GNU General Public License.  It features a PL/SQL debugger, an SQL worksheet with syntax highlighting, a database browser and a comprehensive set of database administration tools.

In addition to Oracle Database support, support for MySQL, PostgreSQL and Teradata databases has been added since the initial launch.

It uses the Qt, and can use the qScintilla2 library.  The Oracle connector uses the Oracle Template Library.

TOra was originally written by Henrik Johnson and copyright by GlobeCom AB, which was acquired by Quest Software.

Start of conversion to being maintained as open source project was made on 2005-02-17 with version 1.3.15.

QT4 conversion took place in 2009 with version 1.4.

See also

 Comparison of database tools

References

External links

SourceForge project page
The Cuddletech SAs Guide to Oracle: TOra, Ben Rockwood (2005-02-10)
TOra, orafaq wiki

Database administration tools
SQL clients
PL/SQL editors
Quest Software
Software that uses Qt
Oracle database tools